Dialogic listening is an alternative to active listening which was developed by John Stewart and Milt Thomas. The word ‘dialogue’ originated from the Greek words ‘dia’, meaning ‘through’ and ‘logos’ meaning ‘words’. Thus dialogic listening means learning through conversation. Dialogic listening is also known as ‘relational listening’ because with the help of exchange of ideas while listening, we also indirectly create a relation.

See also
 Informative listening
 Appreciative listening

References

Interpersonal conflict